Charles Francis Adams may refer to:

 Charles Francis Adams Sr. (1807–1886), grandson of John Adams, son of John Quincy Adams, U.S. congressman, ambassador
 Charles Francis Adams Jr. (1835–1915), son of above, American Civil War general and president of the Union Pacific Railroad
 Charles Francis Adams III (1866–1954), nephew of above, U.S. Navy secretary
 Charles Francis Adams IV (1910–1999), son of above, president of Raytheon
 Charles Adams (ice hockey) (1876–1947), grocery magnate and founder of the Boston Bruins

See also
 Charles F. Adams-class destroyer
 USS Charles F. Adams (DDG-2)
Charles Adams (disambiguation)
Adams (surname)